Luis Maldonado may refer to:

 Luis Maldonado (politician) (born 1954), Puerto Rican politician, mayor of Ciales
 Luis Maldonado (bishop) (died 1596), Roman Catholic bishop of Nueva Caceres
 Luis Maldonado (footballer, born 1985), Uruguayan footballer
 Luis Maldonado (footballer, born 1996), Ecuadorian footballer
 Luis Maldonado Jr., Paraguayan rally driver
 Luis Maldonado, member of Train and Foreigner